Pycnarmon obinusalis is a moth in the family Crambidae. It was described by Francis Walker in 1859. It is found in eastern Pakistan and western India.

References

Spilomelinae
Moths described in 1859
Moths of Asia